David Keith Colapinto (born December 4, 1958 in Springfield, Massachusetts) is an attorney for Kohn, Kohn & Colapinto, a Washington, D.C., USA, law firm specializing in employment law.

He received his J.D. degree from Antioch School of Law (Class of 1987) after graduating from Boston University with a B.A. in history.

While at Boston University, he was an investigative reporter for the b.u. exposure, a student-run independent newspaper dedicated to exposing financial and ethical irregularities of the administration of B.U. President John Silber.

Colapinto was successful in the first case in which a "hostile work environment" was found to exist for a whistleblower who worked at a nuclear power plant. He also helped obtain whistleblower protection for Federal Bureau of Investigation employees and helped force the F.B.I. crime lab to obtain accreditation, the latter development involving him in the O. J. Simpson Trial. As co-counsel to Dr. Frederic Whitehurst, Colapinto was behind the lawsuit that forced the Department of Justice to implement regulations protecting F.B.I. employee whistleblowers. He also served as counsel in the law firm's successful defense of Linda Tripp in her Privacy Act lawsuit against the Departments of Justice and Defense and in defending Marita Murphy in her lawsuit Murphy v. IRS.

Colapinto is General Counsel for the Forensic Justice Project, and he also serves as general counsel for the National Whistleblower Center. He and his partners Stephen M. Kohn and Michael D. Kohn, are the authors of the  book Whistleblower Law: A Guide to Legal Protections for Corporate Employees (Praeger Publishers, 2004).

Notes

External links
Firm lawsite
Dr. Frederic Whitehurst case (United States Court of Appeals for the District of Columbia Circuit)
Murphy v. IRS

American lawyers
1958 births
Living people
American legal writers
Writers from Washington, D.C.
Boston University College of Arts and Sciences alumni
Lawyers from Washington, D.C.
David A. Clarke School of Law alumni